San Gregorio de Nigua is a municipality (municipio) of the San Cristóbal province in the Dominican Republic.

References

Populated places in San Cristóbal Province
Municipalities of the Dominican Republic